AGG01 a peptide antibiotic discovered in the breast milk of the Tammar wallaby,  reportedly one hundred times more powerful than penicillin in vitro.

This compound was found to be effective against MRSA, E. coli, Streptococci, Salmonella, Bacillus subtilis, Pseudomonas spp., Proteus vulgaris, and Staphylococcus aureus.

AGG01 is a cationic peptide, which is a polycationic protein that is rich in positive residues of the amino acids arginine and lysine, and which folds into an amphipathic structure (one which has both hydrophobic and hydrophilic areas). These features mean that it can interact with the anionic lipids in the bacterial membrane, such as phosphatidylglycerol. It inserts itself into the membrane, by competing with cross-linking proteins between each membrane layer, and then sets up trans-membrane protein channels which induce ion transport out of the cell. This causes huge leakage via osmosis through these 'pores' and the general consensus is that the loss of these essential molecules is the mechanism by which bacteria are killed. The bacterial membrane has a different structure from the mammalian plasma membrane, so the protein can only kill pathogenic cells and not human ones.

The compound was in preclinical development in 2007.

References

Antimicrobial peptides